Prospheres is a genus of beetles in the family Buprestidae, containing the following species:

 Prospheres alternecostata Levey, 1978
 Prospheres aurantiopicta (Laporte & Gory, 1837)
 Prospheres chrysocoma Fauvel, 1891
 Prospheres norfolkensis Levey, 1978

References

Buprestidae genera